Avanti Kingdom may refer to:
Avanti (Ancient India)
Avanti Kingdom (Mahabharata), in Sanskrit epics